Nakul Kamal Nath  (born 21 June 1974) is an Indian politician. He  was elected to the Lok Sabha, the lower house of the Parliament of India from Chhindwara, Madhya Pradesh in the 2019 Indian general election as member of the Indian National Congress.

He is the son of congress politician Kamal Nath, former Chief Minister of Madhya Pradesh, a central Indian state. Currently, he is the richest MP in the 17th Lok Sabha with assets worth 660 crore.

Education
Nath went to The Doon School in Dehradun, followed by Bay State College in Boston, and later he pursued an MBA at Boston University.

References

External links
 Official biographical sketch in Parliament of India website

India MPs 2019–present
Lok Sabha members from Madhya Pradesh
Living people
Indian National Congress politicians from Madhya Pradesh
1974 births
The Doon School alumni
Boston University alumni